is a Japanese footballer currently playing as a defender for Mito HollyHock.

Club career
Yamada made his professional debut in a 0–3 Emperor's Cup loss against Thespakusatsu Gunma.

Career statistics

Club
.

Notes

References

External links

1999 births
Living people
Association football people from Saitama Prefecture
Japanese footballers
Japan youth international footballers
Association football defenders
Urawa Red Diamonds players
Mito HollyHock players